Henry Goulburn PC FRS (19 March 1784 – 12 January 1856) was a British Conservative statesman and a member of the Peelite faction after 1846.

Background and education
Born in London, Goulburn was the eldest son of a wealthy planter, Munbee Goulburn, of Amity Hall, Vere Parish, Jamaica, and his wife Susannah, eldest daughter of William Chetwynd, 4th Viscount Chetwynd. He was educated at Trinity College, Cambridge.

Goulburn lived in Betchworth, Dorking, in Betchworth House for much of his life.

Sugar plantation owner
Goulburn's inheritance included a number of sugar estates in Jamaica, with Amity Hall in the parish of Vere, now Clarendon Parish, being the most important. Slave labour was still being used to work the sugar plantations when he inherited the estates.

Goulburn never visited Jamaica himself due to his health and political work. He relied on attorneys to manage his estates on his behalf. One attorney, in particular, Thomas Samson, held the top job at the estate from 1802 to 1818 and earned a reputation for cruelty towards Goulburn's slaves.

By 1818, the income from his Jamaican estates halved to less than £3,000 "although he did console himself that the condition of his slaves had probably improved". 

In 1818, Henry Goulburn's brother was sent to inspect the Jamaican Sugar Plantation. Thomas Samson had already been dismissed over his treatment of slaves. Henry Goulburn wrote to Samson in June 1818:

Political career
In 1808, Goulburn became Member of Parliament for Horsham. In 1810, he was appointed Under-Secretary of State for Home Affairs, and two and a half years later, he was made Under-Secretary of State for War and the Colonies.  It was in this capacity that James Meehan named Goulburn, New South Wales after him, a naming that was ratified by Governor Lachlan Macquarie. Still retaining office in the Tory government, he became a Privy Counsellor in 1821, and shortly afterwards was appointed Chief Secretary for Ireland, a position which he held until April 1827. Here, although he was frequently denounced as he was considered an Orangeman, he had a successful period of office on the whole, and in 1823 he managed to pass the Composition for Tithes (Ireland) Act 1823. In January 1828, he was made Chancellor of the Exchequer under the Duke of Wellington; like his leader, he disliked Roman Catholic emancipation, which he voted against in 1828.

In the finance domain, Goulburn's chief achievements were to reduce the interest rate on the part of the national debt and allow anyone to sell beer upon payment of a small annual fee, a complete change of policy about the drink traffic. Leaving office with Wellington in November 1830, Goulburn was Home Secretary under Sir Robert Peel for four months in 1835. When this statesman returned to office in September 1841, he became Chancellor of the Exchequer for the second time. Although Peel himself did some of the chancellor's work, Goulburn was responsible for a further reduction in the rate of interest on the national debt, and he aided his chief in the struggle, which ended in the repeal of the Corn Laws. With his colleagues, he left office in June 1846. After representing Horsham in the House of Commons for over four years, Goulburn was successively member for St Germans, for West Looe, and for the city of Armagh. In May 1831, he was elected for Cambridge University, and he retained this seat until his death.

According to the Legacies of British Slave-Ownership at the University College London, Goulburn was awarded a payment as a slave trader in the aftermath of the Slavery Abolition Act 1833 with the Slave Compensation Act 1837. The British Government took out a £15 million loan (worth £ in ) with interest from Nathan Mayer Rothschild and Moses Montefiore which was subsequently paid off by the British taxpayers (ending in 2015). Goulburn was associated with two different claims, he owned 277 slaves in Jamaica and received a £5,601 payment at the time (worth £ in ).

Goulburn was a member of the Canterbury Association from 27 March 1848.

Family
Frederick Goulburn (1788–1837), the first Colonial Secretary of New South Wales, was his younger brother. Henry Goulburn married the Hon. Jane, third daughter of Matthew Montagu, 4th Baron Rokeby, in 1811. They had four children. He died on 12 January 1856, aged 71. His wife died the following year.

Notes

References

Further reading

External links 
 

1784 births
1856 deaths
Members of the Privy Council of the United Kingdom
Alumni of Trinity College, Cambridge
Chancellors of the Exchequer of the United Kingdom
British Secretaries of State
Tory MPs (pre-1834)
Irish Conservative Party MPs
Members of the Parliament of the United Kingdom for the University of Cambridge
Conservative Party (UK) MPs for English constituencies
Members of the Parliament of the United Kingdom for County Armagh constituencies (1801–1922)
Members of the Parliament of the United Kingdom for constituencies in Cornwall
Politicians from London
UK MPs 1807–1812
UK MPs 1812–1818
UK MPs 1818–1820
UK MPs 1820–1826
UK MPs 1826–1830
UK MPs 1830–1831
UK MPs 1831–1832
UK MPs 1832–1835
UK MPs 1835–1837
UK MPs 1837–1841
UK MPs 1841–1847
UK MPs 1847–1852
UK MPs 1852–1857
Fellows of the Royal Society
Members of the Canterbury Association
Chief Secretaries for Ireland
Recipients of payments from the Slavery Abolition Act 1833
British slave owners
Church Estates Commissioners